Mbo people may refer to:
 Mbo people (Congo)
 Mbo people (Cameroon)